Bachelor's Baby is a 1932 British comedy film directed by Harry Hughes and starring Ann Casson, William Freshman and Henry Wenman. It was made by British International Pictures at Elstree Studios.

Cast
 Ann Casson as Peggy  
 William Freshman as Jimmy  
 Henry Wenman as Capt. Rogers  
 Alma Taylor as Aunt Mary  
 Ethel Warwick as Mrs. Prowse  
 Charles Paton as Mr. Ponder  
 Connie Emerald as Mrs. Ponder 
 Patrick Ludlow as Clarence 
 Helen Goss
 Pearl Hay

References

Bibliography
 Low, Rachael. Filmmaking in 1930s Britain. George Allen & Unwin, 1985.
 Wood, Linda. British Films, 1927-1939. British Film Institute, 1986.

External links

1932 films
1932 comedy films
British comedy films
Films shot at British International Pictures Studios
Films set in England
Films directed by Harry Hughes
British black-and-white films
1930s English-language films
1930s British films